Human Resource Development Review (HRDR) is an international quarterly peer-reviewed academic journal whose main goal is to promote theory and theory building in human resource development (HRD) and related fields. To accomplish the goal, HRDR seeks to publish four basic types of refereed articles: theory and conceptual articles, integrative literature reviews, theory-building research methods, and foundations of HRD. This journal is a member of the Committee on Publication Ethics (COPE). It is currently published by SAGE Publications. Effective August 1, 2020, the editorial team consists of Editor-in-Chief Dr. Yonjoo Cho (the University of Texas at Tyler), along with Associate Editors: Drs. Meera Alagaraja from the University of Louisville, Julie Davies from Manchester Metropolitan University in the U.K., Hyung Joon Yoon from the Pennsylvania State University, Managing Editor Zandra W. Bosie from the University of Texas at Tyler, and Julia Slater as SAGE publishing editor. The current impact factor for HRDR, as of 2020, is 2.765.  

HRDR was established in 2002 under the editorship of Dr. Elwood Holton. Since its inaugural issue in 2002, there have been a total of six former editors: Drs. Elwood Holton, Richard Torraco, Tom Reio, Jamie Callahan, Julia Storberg-Walker, and Jia Wang. We welcome thoughtful, meaningful, critical, and high quality theoretical, conceptual, and review articles that support theory building and that provide implications for HRD research and practice.

Abstracting and indexing 
Human Resource Development Review is abstracted and indexed in:
 ABI - Authority in Business Research
 ERIC
 NISC
 PsycINFO
 Scopus
 Wilson Business Periodicals Index/Wilson Business Abstracts
 Zetoc

References

External links 
 

SAGE Publishing academic journals
English-language journals
Human resource management journals
Quarterly journals
Publications established in 2002